The Saab 340 AEW&C is a Swedish airborne early warning and control (AEW&C) aircraft; a variant of the Saab 340 aircraft is designated S 100B Argus by the Swedish Air Force.

Radar 
Compared to the traditional circular radar on AWACS planes, such as the E-3 Sentry, the Saab 340 has a non-movable PS-890 AESA radar made with the Erieye system which offers lower drag, but has a dead zone directly behind and in front of the plane, with a 120 degree zone of scan on either side of the airframe. The mounted radar is capable of tracking ships, planes and missiles up to 300-400 km while at an altitude of 20,000 feet.

Operational history 
Six S 100B Argus aircraft were produced for the Swedish Air Force, four of which are permanently equipped with the Erieye active electronically scanned array (AESA) early warning radar and two fitted for transport missions during peacetime.

Two modified planes were loaned to Greece prior to the delivery of EMB-145 Erieye systems, which commenced in 2003.

In July 2006, Saab was awarded a contract to upgrade two of the Swedish Air Force's S 100B aircraft for surveillance missions and for deployment in multi-national operations. The upgraded Saab 340 AEW-300 aircraft, are planned to enter service by 2009.

In November 2007, Thailand announced the intention to buy two S 100B AEW aircraft from the Swedish Air Force.

Variants 
Saab 340B AEW / S 100B Argus (FSR-890) Erieye, for the Thai Air Force.
Saab 340B AEW-200 (IS-340) Erieye
Saab 340B AEW-300 / S 100D Argus  (ASC-890) Erieye

Operators 

Current

 Swedish Air Force operates two aircraft (2 S100D / ASC890) SAAB Globaleye was ordered as replecements in June 2022

 Royal Thai Air Force operates two aircraft delivered completely on October, 2012

Former 

 Hellenic Air Force formerly loaned two aircraft

 United Arab Emirates Air Force - 2 operated. Retired in 2020 after replacement by GlobalEye (Bombardier 6000).

Saab 2000 AEW&C operators
In December 1988, Saab decided to build a stretched derivative of its Saab 340, called Saab 2000

 Pakistan Air Force operates 7 aircraft
 
 Royal Saudi Air Force operates 2 aircraft

Specifications (Saab 340 AEW&C)

See also

References

External links 

340
AWACS aircraft
1990s Swedish military aircraft
Low-wing aircraft
Aircraft first flown in 1994
Twin-turboprop tractor aircraft